Roger Smart or Smert' (fl. 1404) of Kenilworth, Warwickshire, was an English politician.

He was a Member (MP) of the Parliament of England for Warwickshire in January 1404.

References

14th-century births
15th-century deaths
English MPs January 1404
People from Kenilworth